Jarral  is one of the 57 union councils of Abbottabad District in the Khyber Pakhtunkhwa province of Pakistan.

Location 
Jarral is 37 km from the city of Abbottabad and is located in a valley surrounded by large mountains on three sides. On the south of the valley lies the famous Tarbela Dam lake. The southern areas of Jarral UC borders Haripur District.

Jarral is central point of Tanawal area which is linked to two districts of Khyber Pakhtunkhwa i.e. Haripur from the west and Abbottabad to the east. Jarral is a populated village of the area.

Demographics 
Jarral has a population of about 7,000. People of Jarral speak Hindko. Tanolis are the dominant tribe of Jarral with a good number of Awans. Sub-casts of Tanoli includes Hastaal, Molakhail, Kalakhail, Arbaal, Murfhaal, Phujdaari among others. Jarral is a main business point for surrounding villages. Transport facilities for Abbottabad and Haripur are available at Jarral. Jamia Masjid Jarral is known for its architecture work and is the largest in the area. Jarral has beautiful mountains as well as agricultural fields. Jarral has a bank, bazar, post office, telephone exchange and Ufone Booster.

Locals grow seasonal crops such as maize (makai) and wheat (kanak).

The literacy rate of Jarral is on relatively high. The parents are highly motivated to educate their children and take interest in their studies. Higher studies and research are also encouraged here.

A large number of people from Jarral are settled in Karachi, Abbottabad, Rawalpindi, Haripur, and Islamabad.

Subdivisions 
 Bachah Sani
 Bhajwar
 Gul Bandi
 Jabbi
 Jarral
 Khuliala
 Kot Nali
 Nakhey

Name of Mouzziat

Halqa Patwar  
 Jarral
 Jahanabad (Marora)
 Bacha Sani
 Bhajwal
 Gul Bandi
 Jabbi
 Kuthiala
 Kotnali
 Nakhey
 Pind Kargu Khan
 Sherwan
 Jabri

Education 
List of schools running in Jarral.
 Government Primary School (Boys)
 Government Primary School (Girls)
 Government High School (Boys) 
 Government High School (Girls)
 Fatima Jinnah Public School (Private)
 Ghair Rasmi Bunyadi School (NGO)
 Islami Jamia Madrassa

Gallery

See also 
 Abbottabad District

References

External links 

 Jarral Shareef on Google Maps

Union councils of Abbottabad District
Populated places in Abbottabad District